Max Pauly (1 June 1907 – 8 October 1946) was an SS Standartenführer who was the commandant of Stutthof concentration camp from September 1939 to August 1942 and commandant of Neuengamme concentration camp and the associated subcamps from September 1942 until liberation in May 1945. He lived on site with his family. 

Pauly was tried by the British for war crimes with 13 others in the Curio Haus in Hamburg which was located in the British occupied sector of Germany. The trial lasted from 18 March to 13 May 1946. He was found guilty and sentenced to death with 11 other defendants. He was never tried for the crimes committed at Stutthof.

Execution
Pauly was executed by hanging by Albert Pierrepoint in Hamelin Prison on 8 October 1946.

Legacy
Pauly is mentioned under the name of "Hans" in Simon Wiesenthal's 1967 book, The Murderers Among Us (ch. 22, "The Other Side of the Moon").

See also
 Sachsenhausen concentration camp
 SS Cap Arcona (1927) ocean liner
 Defense of the Polish Post Office in Danzig

Notes and references

External links
Neuengamme Museum

1907 births
1946 deaths
People from Wesselburen
SS-Standartenführer
Executed people from Schleswig-Holstein
Curiohaus trials executions by hanging
People from the Province of Schleswig-Holstein
Waffen-SS personnel
Holocaust perpetrators in Poland
Neuengamme concentration camp personnel
Stutthof concentration camp personnel
Executed Nazi concentration camp commandants
Executed mass murderers